Zavana Aranga (born 13 September 1974) is a New Zealand softball player. She competed at the 2000 Summer Olympics in Sydney, where the New Zealand team placed sixth in the women's softball tournament. Aranga also played Rugby League for New Zealand, playing in international matches from 1995 to 1999, captaining the team in 1998.

References

External links

1974 births
Living people
New Zealand softball players
Olympic softball players of New Zealand
Softball players at the 2000 Summer Olympics
20th-century New Zealand women
21st-century New Zealand women